Orthoidea is a superfamily of brachiopods containing the families:
 Family Orthidae
 Family Anomalorthidae
 Family Bohemiellidae
 Family Glyptorthidae
 Family Hesperonomiidae
 Family Hesperorthidae
 Family Lycophoriidae
 Family Nanorthidae
 Family Orthidiellidae
 Family Plaesiomyidae
 Family Poramborthidae
 Family Productorthidae
 Family Whittardiidae

References

Rhynchonellata